LY Aurigae is a multiple star system in the constellation Auriga.  It is an eclipsing binary variable star, dropping in brightness by 0.7 magnitudes every 4 days.  The system is around a thousand light years away in the Auriga OB1 stellar association.

System
LY Aurigae is a close visual binary.  The two stars are magnitude 6.85 and magnitude 8.35 0.6 arc-seconds apart.  Each star is also a spectroscopic binary.

LY Aur A is a double-lined spectroscopic binary with an O9 bright giant and an O9 giant star in contact and eclipsing each other as they orbit every 4 days.  It is classified as a Beta Lyr eclipsing variable system.  The primary eclipse is 0.69 magnitudes deep and the secondary eclipse is 0.60 magnitudes.  Because of the contact nature of the system and the deformed shapes of the stars, the magnitude varies constantly throughout the orbital cycle.  The orbital period is slowly changing due to mass exchange between the stars.  Each star is over a hundred thousand times the luminosity of the sun.

LY Aur B is a single-lined spectroscopic binary with an orbital period of 20.5 days.  It is probably an early B main sequence star and the companion is undetectable.  The two stars combined are 47,000 times the luminosity of the sun.

References

See also
 V* LY Aur
 HIC 25733
 CCDM J05297+3523
 Image LY Aurigae

Auriga (constellation)
Beta Lyrae variables
035921
025733
O-type giants
Eclipsing binaries
Aurigae, LY
B-type giants
Durchmusterung objects
O-type bright giants
4